The St. Moritz–Corviglia Funicular (STMC) is a funicular railway in the canton of Graubünden, Switzerland. The line links the town of St. Moritz at 1848 m with the Corviglia summit and ski area at 2489 m, and comprises two sections of differing gauge, with passengers changing cars at the intermediate station of Chantarella.

At Corviglia, the funicular connects with an aerial tramway to the summit of Piz Nair.

Operation 
The line is operated by the Oberengadiner Bergbahnen and has the following parameters:

See also 
 List of funicular railways
 List of funiculars in Switzerland

References 

Funicular railways in Switzerland
Transport in Graubünden
1200 mm gauge railways in Switzerland
St. Moritz